The 2011 Belgian Figure Skating Championships took place between 19 and 20 November 2010 in Hasselt. Skaters competed in the disciplines of men's singles and ladies' singles across the levels of senior, junior, advanced novice, as well as the age-group levels of minime/miniem A, B, and C.

Senior results

Men

Ladies

External links
 results

2011
2011 in figure skating
2010 in figure skating